Kabala Airport  is a general aviation municipal airport and heliport located in Kabala, Sierra Leone. The Sierra Leone Transportation Authority is in the process of expanding the airport to include a landing strip and other facilities. This will allow non-commercial and small planes to use the airport and will facilitate travel throughout the Province.

References

Airports in Sierra Leone